Julie Andrews is an actress, singer, and theatrical director who has had a lifelong career on the screen and stage. She made her film debut voice-dubbing the role of Princess Zeila in the 1949 animated film La Rosa di Bagdad. Her professional stage debut was in the musical comedy The Boy Friend where she played Polly Brown from 1954 to 1955. For this role, she won the Theatre World Award for Outstanding Broadway Debut in 1955. Then from 1956 to 1959, Andrews played Eliza Doolittle in My Fair Lady which earned her a Tony Award nomination, the first of three that she received during her career. After this success, she played the title role in the 1957 television special Rogers and Hammerstein's Cinderella. For this appearance, she received her first Primetime Emmy Award nomination for Outstanding Actress – Best Single Performance – Lead or Support. She received her second Tony nomination in 1961 when she originated the role of Queen Guinevere in Camelot. After this, she auditioned for the role of Eliza Doolittle in the 1964 film adaptation of My Fair Lady, losing the role to Audrey Hepburn. Instead, Andrews was cast as the title role in the 1964 musical film Mary Poppins. For this role, she received an Academy Award, a BAFTA Award, a Golden Globe, and a Grammy Award. Her next big success was portraying Maria Von Trapp in the 1965 musical film The Sound of Music. For her portrayal, she received a second Golden Globe, another Academy Award nomination and another BAFTA nomination.

Between 1964 and 1986, Andrews starred in many films including The Americanization of Emily (1964), Hawaii (1966), Torn Curtain (1966), Thoroughly Modern Millie (1967), Star! (1968), The Tamarind Seed (1974), 10 (1979), S.O.B. (1981), Victor/Victoria (1982) for which she earned her sixth Golden Globe, That's Life! (1986) and Duet for One (1986). From 1972 to 1973, she hosted her own variety show titled The Julie Andrews Hour. The program earned her a Primetime Emmy Award and a second nomination. In 1992, she starred in the short-lived American sitcom Julie. She returned to the stage in the Stephen Sondheim-themed musical revue Putting It Together, where she starred as Amy, in 1993. She reprised her role as Victoria Grant / Count Victor Grezhinski for the 1995 Broadway adaptation of Victor/Victoria. This earned her a third Tony Award nomination, though she declined, citing that she felt that the rest of the company had been overlooked, and her first Drama Desk Award. Since 2000, she has been seen on screen as Queen Clarisse Renaldi in the television film The Princess Diaries (2001) and its sequel (2004) and as Lily the Head Fairy in Tooth Fairy (2010). She has lent her voice to Shrek 2 (2004), Enchanted (2007), Shrek Forever After'''', Despicable Me (both 2010), Despicable Me 3 (2017), Aquaman (2018), and Minions: The Rise of Gru (2022). In 2017, she directed a revival of My Fair Lady at the Sydney Opera House for Opera Australia. Her direction earned her a nomination for the Helpmann Award for Best Direction of a Musical. The same year, she co-created and hosted a children's educational show titled Julie's Greenroom'', for which she received two Daytime Emmy Award nominations.

Film

Television

Stage

See also 
 List of awards and nominations received by Julie Andrews

References

External links 
 Julie Andrews on IMDb
 Julie Andrews at the Internet Broadway Database

Actress filmographies
Screen and stage
British filmographies